The Melbourne Conservatorium of Music is the music school at the University of Melbourne and part of the Faculty of Fine Arts and Music. It is located near the Melbourne City Centre on the Southbank campus of the University of Melbourne.

Degree programs specialising in music performance, composition, musicology, ethnomusicology, conducting, pedagogy and music therapy are taught at the Conservatorium, which also runs an Early Music Studio, and oversees the publishing house Lyrebird Press. It offers graduate programs including certificates and diplomas, and research and coursework awards at the masters and doctoral levels.

History
The teaching of music at the University of Melbourne has been undertaken under a number of administrative structures. The first award of a degree in music (a Bachelor of Music) was recorded in 1879, and the first Chair of Music, endowed by Francis Ormond – known as the Ormond Professor of Music - was occupied from 1891, even though there was not yet a department or faculty of music at the university.

Through the efforts of the first Ormond Professor, G.W.L. Marshall-Hall, this was rectified in 1894 with the founding of the "University Conservatorium", whose leased premises were located in the Queen's Coffee Palace, a six-storey building on the corner of Rathdowne and Victoria Streets, Carlton. The foundation stone for a permanent Conservatorium in Royal Parade, on the University campus, was laid by Dame Nellie Melba on 26 November 1909, and the building, designed by Bates, Peebles & Smart, was opened in 1913. Assisted by a donation of £1,000 from a benefit concert arranged by Melba, which was matched by the Victorian State Government, the concert room now known as Melba Hall was added and opened by the Governor-General, Lord Denman, on 29 October 1913.

The Conservatorium became the Faculty of Music within the University of Melbourne in 1926, and the first Dean was appointed. This was to be the administrative structure for the next 65 years.

Contemporary times
The Faculty of the VCA and Music was created in 2009 from the amalgamation of the University's Faculty of Music and Faculty of the Victorian College of the Arts. On 1 January 2012 the two operating divisions became known as the Faculty of the Victorian College of the Arts and Melbourne Conservatorium of Music (Faculty of VCA and MCM).

On 1 January 2018, the Faculty's name was changed again to the Faculty of Fine Arts and Music. The Victorian College of the Arts and Melbourne Conservatorium remain as schools within the Faculty. In March 2019 the majority of Conservatorium operations moved to the new Ian Potter Southbank Centre, a state of the art facility for music. This makes the Southbank Campus of the University of Melbourne the largest creative tertiary education provider situated inside an arts precinct in the country, and one of the few so located in the world.

Notable people

Ormond Professor of Music

G.W.L. Marshall-Hall, 1891–1900
Franklin Peterson, 1901–1914
G.W.L. Marshall-Hall, 1915
William Laver, 1915–1925
Sir Bernard Heinze, 1926–1957
George Loughlin, 1958–1979
Michael Brimer, 1980–1989
Warren Bebbington, 1991–2008
Gary E. McPherson, 2009–present

Directors of the University Conservatorium

G.W.L. Marshall-Hall, 1895–1900
Franklin Peterson, 1901–1914
William Laver, 1915–1925
Sir Bernard Heinze, 1926–1957
J. Sutton Crow, 1943–1945
George Loughlin, 1958–1974

Deans of the Faculty of Music

Bernard Heinze, 1926–1942
J. Sutton Crow, 1943 (Acting)
Sir Bernard Heinze, 1944–1952
Charles Moorhouse, 1953 (Acting)
Sir Bernard Heinze, 1954–1957
Donald Cochrane, 1957 (Acting)
George Loughlin, 1958–1965
Richard Samuel, 1966
George Loughlin, 1967–1970
Raymond Martin, 1971
George Loughlin, 1972–1974
Maxwell Cooke, 1975–1980
Michael Brimer, 1981–1985
Ronald Farren-Price, 1986–1990

Head of the School of Music within the Faculty of Music, Visual and Performing Arts

John Griffiths, 1991
Warren Bebbington, 1992–1994

Deans of the Faculty of Music (re-instituted)

Warren Bebbington, 1994–2006
Cathy Falk, 2007 (Acting)
Cathy Falk, 2008

Directors of the Melbourne Conservatorium of Music

 Gary E. McPherson. 2011–2019 (Head, School of Music within the Faculty of the VCA and MCM, 2009–2010)
 Richard Kurth. 2019-

Graduates
 Helen Adams, soprano
 Arthur Chanter (-1950), composer
 Bryony Marks, composer

References

External links
 Official website
 Music Students' Society of Melbourne Conservatorium of Music

Music schools in Australia
University of Melbourne
Educational institutions established in 1894
1894 establishments in Australia